Nainital Lok Sabha constituency was a Lok Sabha (parliamentary) constituency in Uttarakhand. This constituency came into existence in 1952 and existed until 2009, following the delimitation of Lok Sabha constituencies.

Assembly segments

Before the formation of Uttarakhand

Nainital Lok Sabha constituency comprised the following five Vidhan Sabha (legislative assembly) constituency segments of Uttar Pradesh:

After the formation of Uttarakhand

Nainital Lok Sabha constituency comprised the following twelve Vidhan Sabha (legislative assembly) constituency segments of Uttarakhand:

Members of Parliament
Keys:

See also
 Nainital–Udhamsingh Nagar (Lok Sabha constituency)
 List of former constituencies of the Lok Sabha

References

Former Lok Sabha constituencies of Uttarakhand
Former constituencies of the Lok Sabha